The 2004 New England Grand Prix was the third race for the 2004 American Le Mans Series season held at Lime Rock Park.  It took place on July 5, 2004.

Official results

Class winners in bold.  Cars failing to complete 70% of winner's distance marked as Not Classified (NC).

Statistics
 Pole Position - #16 Dyson Racing - 47.962
 Fastest Lap - #16 Dyson Racing - 49.059
 Distance - 
 Average Speed -

External links
 

N
Northeast Grand Prix
Grand